Raymond De'Andre Martin (born September 13, 1988), known professionally as Rey Reel, is an American record producer and songwriter. Reel has produced for artists such as Fabri Fibra, Beyonce, Nicki Minaj, Mariah Carey, Drake, Lil Wayne, will.i.am and Britney Spears among others. Rey Reel signed a publishing deal with Sony/ATV in May 2015. He is perhaps best known for producing Beyonce's "Flawless", Drake's "Trophies", will.i.am's "Scream & Shout" (Remix)., and Fabri Fibra's "Come Vasco". Rey has also done scores for Tv shows such as Lucifer, Empire, Apple.com ( commercial ), and more. He made his first tv appearance in Oxygen's musical tv show for the strong female artist " Sisterhood of Hip Hop " and is continuing to further his career in acting.

Musical career 
Rey Reel began pursuing his production career at age 15 in his home studio. He forged a partnership with hip hop duo Audio Push and produced the hit, "Teach Me How To Jerk". He began collaborating with childhood friend Hit-Boy and together, the duo produced songs for Diddy, Britney Spears, Drake, and Mariah Carey. In December 2014, Rey Reel was nominated for his first Grammy for his production contribution on the Grammy nominated "Beyonce" for Album of the Year.

Production Style 
Rey has been quoted describing his sound as "...more of the experimental type; I don't like to tie myself down to just one genre. I want to try everything. I'm actually just now starting to listen to some country music so I can cater to that kind of artist. It may not end up being my thing, but I want to try it first and see how it goes. I tend to favor pop, only because I like to mash hip hop drums with pop sounds." His production is based around an alternative keyboard.

Awards and nominations
Grammy Nominations

BMI Awards

Production Discography 
Singles Produced

Rey Reel's Production

References 

American record producers